Djamel Benchergui (born 7 December 1981) is an Algerian professional footballer. He currently plays as a defender for the Algerian Algerian Ligue Professionnelle 2 club Amel Bou Saâda.

References

External links

Djamel Benchergui at Footballdatabase

1981 births
Living people
Algerian footballers
CA Bordj Bou Arréridj players
USM Annaba players
Algerian Ligue Professionnelle 1 players
Algerian Ligue 2 players
AS Khroub players
Paradou AC players
WA Tlemcen players
Association football defenders
21st-century Algerian people